Obata Station may refer to:

 Obata Station (Aichi) (小幡駅), Japan
 Obata Station (Mie) (小俣駅), Japan